Lâm is a Vietnamese surname. The name is transliterated as Lin in Chinese and Im in Korean.

Lam is the anglicized variation of the surname Lâm.

Lam is also a commonly held surname of Cantonese speakers of Chinese descent. Large populations in southern China and Hong Kong hold the surname.

Notable people with the surname Lâm
Lam Phương, 20th century Vietnamese songwriter, real name Lâm Đình Phùng
Lam Nguon Tanh (Lâm Ngươn Tánh), Chief of Naval Operations of the Republic of Vietnam Navy during the Vietnam War
Thích Quảng Đức (born Lâm Văn Tức), Mahayana Buddhist monk who burned himself to death at a busy Saigon road intersection on 11 June 1963
 Lam Nhat Tien, Vietnamese American singer
 Lam Quang Thi, senior military officer in the Army of the Republic of Vietnam during the Vietnam War
Lam Quang My, Polish-Vietnamese poet who writes in Polish and Vietnamese
Lam Van Phat, an officer in the Army of the Republic of Vietnam
Lâm Quang Ky, a vice-general of Nguyen Trung Truc 
Lâm Thị Mỹ Dạ, poet

Vietnamese-language surnames